The 2020 UTSA Roadrunners football team represented the University of Texas at San Antonio during the 2020 NCAA Division I FBS football season. The Roadrunners played their home games at the Alamodome in San Antonio, Texas, and competed in the West Division of Conference USA (CUSA). They were led by first-year head coach Jeff Traylor.

Previous season
The Roadrunners finished the 2019 regular season 4–8, 3–5 in CUSA play which they tied for fourth in the West Division with North Texas and Rice. They were not invited to play in any post season bowl game. Frank Wilson was fired in December 2019, a day after losing to Louisiana Tech.

Preseason

Award watch lists 
Listed in the order that they were released

CUSA media days
The CUSA Media Days were held virtually for the first time in conference history.

Preseason All-CUSA teams
To be released

Schedule
UTSA announced its 2020 football schedule on January 8, 2020. The 2020 schedule consisted of 6 home and 6 away games in the regular season.

The Roadrunners had games scheduled against Grambling State, LSU, Old Dominion, and Rice that were canceled due to the COVID-19 pandemic.

On December 13, the Roadrunners accepted a bid to the Frisco Bowl, to face the SMU Mustangs. However, on December 15, the bowl was canceled due to COVID-19 concerns within the SMU program, and UTSA accepted an invitation to the First Responder Bowl.

Coaching staff

Game summaries

at Texas State

Stephen F. Austin

Middle Tennessee

at UAB

at BYU

Army

Louisiana Tech

at Florida Atlantic

UTEP

at Southern Miss

North Texas

vs. Louisiana (First Responder Bowl)

References

UTSA
UTSA Roadrunners football seasons
UTSA Roadrunners football